Eunidia lateraloides is a species of beetle in the family Cerambycidae. It was described by Stephan von Breuning in 1963. It is known from Borneo and Malaysia.

References

Eunidiini
Beetles described in 1963